The United States District Court for the Northern District of Mississippi (in case citations, N.D. Miss.) is a federal court in the Fifth Circuit with facilities in Aberdeen, Greenville, and Oxford.

Appeals from cases brought in the Northern District of Mississippi are taken to the United States Court of Appeals for the Fifth Circuit (except for patent claims and claims against the U.S. government under the Tucker Act, which are appealed to the Federal Circuit).

The United States Attorney for the Northern District of Mississippi represents the United States in civil and criminal litigation in the court.  the Acting United States Attorney is Clay Joyner.

Jurisdiction

The northern district comprises three divisions.
 The Aberdeen Division comprises the counties of Alcorn, Chickasaw, Choctaw, Clay, Itawamba, Lee, Lowndes, Monroe, Oktibbeha, Prentiss, Tishomingo, Webster and Winston.The court for the Aberdeen Division is held at Aberdeen, Ackerman and Corinth.
 The Oxford Division comprises the counties of Benton, Calhoun, DeSoto, Lafayette, Marshall, Panola, Pontotoc, Quitman, Tallahatchie, Tate, Tippah, Tunica, Union and Yalobusha.The court for the Oxford Division is held at Oxford.
 The Greenville Division comprises the counties of Attala, Bolivar, Carroll, Coahoma, Grenada, Humphreys, Leflore, Montgomery, Sunflower and Washington.The court for the Greenville Division is held at Clarksdale, Cleveland and Greenville.

Current judges
:

Vacancies and pending nominations

Former judges

Chief judges

Succession of seats

See also
 Courts of Mississippi
 List of current United States district judges
 List of United States federal courthouses in Mississippi

Footnotes

Further reading
 David M. Hargrove, Mississippi's Federal Courts: A History. Jackson, MS: University Press of Mississippi, 2019.

External links
U.S. District Court for the Northern District of Mississippi

Mississippi, Northern District
Mississippi law
Monroe County, Mississippi
Choctaw County, Mississippi
Coahoma County, Mississippi
Bolivar County, Mississippi
Alcorn County, Mississippi
Washington County, Mississippi
Lafayette County, Mississippi
1838 establishments in Mississippi
Courthouses in Mississippi
Courts and tribunals established in 1838